Bensonhurst Park is a park in Bath Beach, Brooklyn, New York City. The park stretches from the north border at Cropsey Avenue to the south border at Lower New York Bay. The park has a playground on the north-east side, a field in the middle of the playground and several basketball courts on the west side. There is also a bathroom in the northwest side of the park.

History
The first calls for a park at Bath Beach began in 1891. The initial 16 acres of parkland was acquired in 1895, followed by additional purchases in 1924 and 1944.

In 2016, a $6.5 million renovation was announced for Bensonhurst Park. Renovations began in September 2019 with an expected completion date.

Geography

Bensonhurst Park borders Cropsey Avenue to the north, Belt Parkway in the middle, Bay Parkway to the east, and 21st Avenue to the west. The park borders Gravesend Bay as well.

References

External links
 https://www.nycgovparks.org/parks/bensonhurst-park

Parks in Brooklyn